Goshen College is a private Mennonite liberal arts college in Goshen, Indiana. It was founded in 1894 as the Elkhart Institute of Science, Industry and the Arts, and is affiliated with Mennonite Church USA. The college is accredited by the Higher Learning Commission and has an enrollment of 749 students. While Goshen maintains a distinctive liberal Mennonite worldview and Mennonites make up 43 percent of the student body, it admits students of all religions.

Goshen College is home to The Mennonite Quarterly Review and the Mennonite Historical Library, a research library compiling one of the world's most comprehensive collection of Anabaptist and Mennonite primary source material.

History 
"Old" Mennonites started the Elkhart Institute in Elkhart, Indiana, in August 1894, to prepare Mennonite youth for college. H.A. Mumaw, a practicing physician, first led the small operation with a group of 15 "Old" Mennonite ministers and laymen started a corporation that they named the Elkhart Institute association. Lured by businessmen to relocate several miles away to Goshen, Indiana, the Institute moved in September 1903 and added a junior college course list, renaming itself Goshen College.  By 1905, the Mennonite Board of Education had taken control of the college, dissolving the Elkhart Institute Association. After 1910, most of Goshen's students were enrolled in college courses. From 1914 to 1919, partly out of response to its constituents, Goshen College attempted a "School of Agriculture," which sought to prepare Mennonite young people to return to their rural communities; the hope was that such a program would spark a technological revolution among some of the farmers, but it was never a success and was cut after World War I, five years after it began. The college-prep academy program of Goshen College was discontinued in 1935.

The school was closed during the 1923–1924 school year by the Mennonite Board of Education but reopened the following year. One of many factors in closing the college was denominational tension due to modernist and fundamentalist Christian theologies of the 1920s and their impact on Mennonite theology at the school. In response to this crisis, many of Goshen's faculty and dozens of students, angry with the Mennonite Board of Education's decision, relocated to Bluffton College. As part of the larger ongoing reaction against liberalism through the early 20th century, Hesston College and Eastern Mennonite School were formed among "Old" Mennonites, although staunch traditionalists realized that no higher education was particularly safe.

When the institution was reopened, it was marked by the new leadership of president S.C. Yoder and dean Noah Oyer, who manifested outstanding abilities. His character was one marked by simplicity, modesty, and refinement, as well as unusual wisdom and insight. Under his leadership the educational program of the college developed rapidly, and much of the strength of the present college program is due to his untiring and wise endeavors. After dean Oyer's untimely passing in 1931, Harold Bender became dean. He was a man whose influence upon the "Old" Mennonites was significant for much of the 20th century. Bender carefully piloted the stormy waters of theology by stating that Mennonitism was not liberalism. Bender later went on to say that fundamentalism also contributed to problems with theology and created The Anabaptist Vision, a "third way" that sought to spell out the direction for the future Mennonite Church. More than arguing doctrine, Bender and a younger group of intellectuals at Goshen College sought to shape the Mennonite faith that was more ideological than institutional. The goal was to articulate a faith that could stand the test of academic scrutiny in broader society while carefully upholding traditional beliefs of the church. Out of this ideology, Bender started The Mennonite Quarterly Review. Throughout this time, Goshen remained the epicenter of "Old" Mennonite theology and higher education, and became known as the "Goshen Historical Renaissance".

During the 1940s, Goshen was one of the Mennonite Central Committee's key places to form a "relief training school" that helped to train volunteers for unpaid jobs in the Civilian Public Service, an alternative to the Army. Many Mennonites chose the civilian service alternative because of their beliefs regarding Biblical pacifism and nonresistance.  Although the young women pacifists were not liable to the draft, they volunteered for unpaid Civilian Public Service jobs to demonstrate their patriotism; many worked in mental hospitals.

In 1980, the college was granted care of Merry Lea Environmental Learning Center, a  nature preserve that now offers Goshen's master's degree in Environmental Science.

In 1993, Harold and Wilma Good, longtime friends of the college, left their estate to Goshen. The estate was estimated at $28 million, the majority in stock of the J.M. Smucker Company. Wilma was a daughter of the company's founder. The college sold the stock and added the funds to its endowment, more than doubling it.

The campus experienced a building boom in the later half of the 1990s through the present, with an estimated $30 million in new or renovated structures on campus. This included the addition of the Roman Gingerich Recreation-Fitness Center, the Music Center, the Connector, and the renovation of all dormitories. The college is currently working on a new campus master plan and strategic plan that will define the college's priorities for the years ahead. Today, more than 20,000 Goshen College alumni have been counted, residing in more than 85 countries.

Publications 
The Mennonite Quarterly Review, Mennonite Historical Library, Mennonite Church USA Archives, including Mennonite Central Committee archives, offices of "The Mennonite", and it has numerous alumni connections with the broader Mennonite Church.

Academics 
Goshen College offers 41 majors and 47 minors for undergraduates.  Some of the most popular programs are nursing, biology, business, communication, education, American Sign Language and environmental science. The college also offers a Master of Arts in Environmental Education, a master's degree in intercultural leadership, and a master's degree in nursing with two tracks: family nurse practitioner and clinical nurse leader. In 2014, Goshen College partnered with Eastern Mennonite University and Bluffton University to launch the Collaborative MBA program.

The academic year is divided into two semester terms, with an additional May term.

Study-Service Term 

Intercultural education is a requirement for all students at Goshen College.  To fulfill the requirement, students will either spend a semester abroad or complete an intercultural experience in the United States.  Goshen College's Study-Service Term (SST) is a program which approximately 80 percent of students participate in to complete their intercultural study requirement. Students typically study the language and culture for six weeks, usually in the capital city, then do some sort of service work in a more remote area for the remaining six weeks. Service may include working at a hospital, nursing home, kindergarten, or missionary service. The college has in the past also offered a domestic SST to immerse students in the Latino culture and community in northern Indiana.

Student life

Clubs and organizations 

Goshen College has no official fraternities or sororities; however, many different types of clubs and organizations exist to help facilitate campus life.  Clubs that play a significant part in campus life include: Black Student Union (BSU), Latino Student Union (LSU), International Student Club (ISC), Advocates, Student-Athlete Advisory Committee (SAAC), Nursing Student Association, Hymn Club, Voices and Harmony, Social Work Action Association (SWAA), Art Club, Pre-Med Club, Goshen Student Women's Association (GSWA), PAX and Eco-PAX, The Record (student-run newspaper).

Campus Activities Council, or CAC, is the primary extracurricular organization on campus that hosts a variety of weekend activities and events. CAC is responsible for "Kick Off," a talent show held at the beginning of the fall semester. CAC also hosts "Hour After" shows, where talented students on campus perform music, comedy, or dancing for the audience.

International students 
The International Students Club (ISC) hosts the Coffeehouse every year, an event during which international students demonstrate their artistic talents. Students are also given the opportunity, through Global Citizenship, to individually talk about their culture, and have it published by the Goshen College newspaper.

Intramural athletics 
Intramural athletics are also offered.  Throughout the year, students can participate in the coed sports of outdoor soccer, volleyball, sand volleyball, kickball, ping-pong, pickleball, touch football, ultimate frisbee, and wiffleball, as well as basketball, indoor soccer, and 3-on-3 basketball.

Media 

The Record is an award-winning weekly student newspaper that serves Goshen College and the community. In 2022, the Indiana Collegiate Press Association named The Record the "Newspaper of the Year" in the college division for the fifth consecutive year. The college's radio station, WGCS, branded as 91.1FM The Globe, is consistently ranked among the top collegiate stations in the country. On March 12, 2011, The Globe was named the Best College Station in the Nation, winning first place at the 71st Annual Conference of the Intercollegiate Broadcasting System (IBS) in New York City. On March 2, 2013, The Globe was again named Best College Station in the Nation, making it the first college to win the award twice. Since then, 91.1 the Globe has been awarded "Radio Station of the Year" by the Indiana Association of State Broadcasters six times, their most recent in March 2020. Globe Media also produces a monthly news show, "The Globe News Report", which covers campus and community news, along with a weekly sports show, "The Globe Sports Corner", covering Goshen College Athletics. It has also been involved in several larger projects, including the broadcast of the school's annual Festival of Carols on WNIT. In the summer of 2011, the Goshen College communication department launched FiveCore Media, a video production company aimed at providing services for both on-campus and off-campus clients. Globe Media also produces a weekly sports show, "The Globe Sports Corner", featuring athlete and coaches interviews, along with an in-depth story highlighting athletes and teams across campus.

Performing arts 

Goshen College students have a variety of shows to attend in the Music Center's Sauder Concert Hall or Rieth Recital Hall or the Umble Center, Goshen's theater. With the addition of the Music Center to campus, the college has offered a Performing Arts Series of nationally renowned artists from across the country. Previous guests include Garrison Keillor and A Prairie Home Companion, Indigo Girls, The Wailin' Jennys, Nickel Creek, Colm Wilkinson, Chanticleer, Canadian Brass, Tokyo String Quartet, Seraphic Fire, and Lincoln Center Jazz Orchestra with Wynton Marsalis.

Spiritual life 
Because Goshen is a Christian college, spirituality plays an important part of campus life.  Although Goshen maintains that people of different faiths are welcome to the college, the school emphasizes Judeo-Christian values in regard to operation, justice, and teaching. Historically, all faculty members at the school have been Christian, with a large portion adhering to Mennonite convictions.  The college holds convocations or chapels every Wednesday, with occasional special events, such as Dr. Martin Luther King, Jr. Day. Students are required to attend half of these services per semester.

Goshen College operates a campus ministries team, headed by the campus pastor. The team includes an assistant campus minister and student leaders who help guide and plan spiritual life on campus for the school year. Activities include managing the network of Goshen's small groups, spiritual friendship, leading campus worship, and planning chapels. Because service is an important aspect of Christian faith, volunteerism ties in with spiritual life on campus.

Volunteerism 
Every September, Goshen College participates in an activity called Celebrate Service Day (CSD). Students team with professors and administrative faculty and go out into the larger Goshen community for a day of service. First-year students go with their colloquium advisers, while other students go with their dormitory floor or small group. Aside from CSD, many students donate their time to work at local kindergartens, elementary schools, hospitals, and nursing homes.

Athletics 
The Goshen athletic teams are called the Maple Leafs (chosen due to the city of Goshen being referred to as "The Maple City"). The college is a member of the National Association of Intercollegiate Athletics (NAIA), primarily competing in the Crossroads League (formerly known as the Mid-Central College Conference (MCCC) until after the 2011–12 school year) for most of its sports since the 1970–71 academic year; while its men's volleyball competes in the Wolverine–Hoosier Athletic Conference (WHAC).

Goshen competes in 14 intercollegiate varsity sports: Men's sports include baseball, basketball, cross country, soccer, tennis, track & field and volleyball; while women's sports include basketball, cross country, soccer, softball, tennis, track & field and volleyball.

Goshen athletic teams also compete in the US Highway 20 Cup, a competition that began in the 2019–2020 academic year, due to the rivalry between Goshen College and Bethel University. Points will be awarded to the winning team in each of the schools' 15 shared sports, with the points divided in sports where the teams meet more than once. In cross country and track and field, where the league standings are determined solely by placement at the Crossroads League meet, the higher-finishing team will receive the point.

On October 7, 2022, Goshen College introduced Dash, the first official mascot in school history.  The name was decided in a poll amongst faculty and students.

Campus facilities 
Goshen College has four dormitories, apartment living, and several small group houses.  Outside the original quadrangle, Goshen's current campus has not been the result of a single master plan; rather the campus has evolved eclectically from building to building as the institution grew. Four-year residency was typical until the mid-1970s, when a growing student enrollment prompted school officials to forgo building new dormitories and allow upperclassmen to live off campus. In 2005, Goshen College announced its plan to return to four-year residency. With more students on campus, the school has spent over $10 million building and renovating dorms.

The Roman Gingerich Recreation and Fitness Center is a $7 million facility constructed in 1994 with three full-sized basketball courts, four racquetball courts, a 200-meter indoor track, (formerly) swimming pool (for recreational swimming only) and hot tub, climbing wall, and weight room. The fitness center is open to all students and staff, and is used by community members as well.

The $24 million Music Center, completed in October 2002, has become regionally renowned for its design and acoustics. The Music Center consists of several main sections: Sauder Concert Hall, Rieth Recital Hall, the Art Gallery, and various classrooms, practice rooms and offices. Several highlights are a central recording studio, MIDI labs, and Taylor and Boody Opus 41, a 1600-pipe tracker pipe organ, the first in the world with tempering based on alumnus Bradley Lehman's research of Johann Sebastian Bach's notation.  The facility was designed by Mathes Brierre Architects (design architects), Schmidt Associates (architects of record), and TALASKE (acoustics and audio consultants).

In September 2019, Goshen College completed the renovation and remodeling of their Union Center. The Union Center holds the Leaf Raker Cafe, as well as adding the new Juanita Lark Welcome Center.

Sustainability 

In 2007, then Goshen College President Jim Brenneman became a charter signatory to the American College & University Presidents Climate Commitment joining with leaders of 175 other higher education institutions that have agreed to neutralize greenhouse gas emissions on their campuses. In 2008, Rieth Village at Merry Lea Environmental Learning Center of Goshen College became the first platinum-rated LEED building in Indiana. In the spring of 2013, the college took the further step of purchasing 100 percent of its electricity from renewable sources through the procurement of renewable energy credits. A computerized building temperature regulation system, motion light sensors for indoor and outdoor lighting and open loop ground-source heat pumps further reduce energy consumption on campus. The campus has also converted nearly 20 percent of its lawn space to native plants and prairie restoration. Goshen College students and staff have developed a food composting system, planted a community garden, built a solar hot water collection system and continued to reduce energy consumption campus-wide. In 2014, the college earned a silver rating from the Sustainability Tracking, Assessment and Rating System (STARS) report for its sustainability efforts. Through an aggressive energy reduction program and efficiency upgrades, Goshen College has reduced electric consumption by 25 percent and gas consumption by 23 percent since 2007.

Small Group Housing 

Small Group Housing (SGH) is an option for juniors and seniors on Goshen's campus. Started in the 1970s, SGH offers students the opportunity to live in a house arrangement, with common kitchen and living spaces. The purpose of SGH is for students to develop another living experience alternative to dormitory life. This same idea was carried out with the construction of the Apartments. Goshen College maintains that SGH living is a privilege, and students must apply as a group to live in a residence. An application board consisting of resident directors, spiritual life, and physical plant review all potential candidates in the spring for the next school year. Each group must create a housing plan, division of responsibility, show examples of volunteerism, and a commitment to better the Goshen campus, as well as resolve conflict. Other factors considered in the application process include house cumulative GPA, extracurricular involvement, median age of the group, and personal faculty recommendations. Houses are then rewarded to applying groups who exemplify high academic, moral, and volunteer efforts, based on objective and subjective review.

Goshen College students have also lived in local housing not associated with the college.

Satellite facilities 
Goshen College maintains Merry Lea Environmental Center in Indiana, and the J.N. Roth Marine Biology Station in Layton, Florida.

Other properties maintained by Goshen College include: Brunk's Cabin, a retreat property complete with a sledding hill in Cass County, Michigan, Witmer Woods, a  arboretum with over 100 native Indiana species, and the adjacent property College Cabin (Reservoir Place), used for special events, along the Elkhart River and millrace.

Controversy

National anthem 
On January 21, 2010, The President's Council announced a change to Goshen's long-standing policy, and thus allowing an instrumental version of the national anthem to be played prior to some college sporting events. This decision led to numerous complaints from students, faculty and alumni.  College art professor, John Blosser, was quoted saying, “It’s obviously about a battle.  It’s rather violent. It’s about using violence to conquer and that would be something that many people here would have problems with.” In response, Goshen's Board of Directors reversed the President's Council decision on June 6, 2011, after seeking extensive input from the college community.

The incident thrust Goshen College into the national limelight that June when several reports on Fox News publicized the fact that the college refused to play the national anthem, "The Star-Spangled Banner," at its athletic events.  Two Goshen city councilmen publicly criticized the college, with one referring to the decision as "anti-American" and stating that "instead of living here in Goshen, they should go down and live in Cuba or Iran, then have them come back and see if their attitude has changed."  The college, loosely affiliated with Mennonite Church USA, which is traditionally a peace church, published an online fact sheet stating that "historically, playing the national anthem has not been among Goshen College's practices because of our Christ-centered core value of compassionate peacemaking seeming to be in conflict with the anthem’s militaristic language."

The college's then president, Dr. James E. Brenneman, announced on August 19, 2011, that as an alternative, "America the Beautiful" would be played before select athletic events.

Same-sex marriage 
Goshen, along with sister school Eastern Mennonite University (EMU), created a stir within the Christian college community in July 2015, when the two became the first Council for Christian Colleges and Universities (CCCU) member schools to add "sexual orientation" to their anti-discrimination policy, clearing the way for the hiring of openly gay employees.  The decision created a rift in the CCCU, which lobbies among other things, on behalf of the rights of Christian schools to hire employees who adhere to orthodox Christian teachings on marriage.  Two CCCU member-schools – Union University and Oklahoma Wesleyan University (OKWU) – had already resigned from the organization in protest, and up to forty other member schools were poised to follow the lead of Union and OKWU, before Goshen and EMU voluntarily withdrew their membership from the organization.

Notable people 

Goshen's motto, "Culture for Service" is evident in many graduates and faculty.  Below is a partial list of notable people who have been associated with the college:

 Stephen Ainlay- 18th president of Union College.
 David P. Bartel (1982) – professor of biology at Massachusetts Institute of Technology.
 Philip A. Beachy Professor at Stanford University School of Medicine, and an Associate at Stanford's Institute of Stem Cell Biology and Regenerative Medicine.
 Roger N. Beachy (1966) – Director of the National Institute of Food and Agriculture (NIFA).
 Harold S. Bender – Author, Professor, College Dean, founder of Mennonite Quarterly Review.
 Howard Dyck - Canadian conductor and radio broadcaster
 Denise Konan (1988) - Dean of the College of Social Sciences at the University of Hawaii at Manoa.
 Errick McCollum – American professional basketball player who plays for Anadolu Efes of the Turkish Basketball Super League and the EuroLeague.
 Carrie Newcomer – American singer, songwriter and author who has received numerous awards for her music and related charitable activities.
 Sofia Samatar (1993) – award-winning author of A Stranger in Olondria.
 Katie Sowers- NFL football coach
 James C. Strouse (1999) – screenwriter and director.
 Ellah Wakatama Allfrey- Editor-at-Large at Canongate Books, a senior Research Fellow at Manchester University and Chair of the AKO Caine Prize for African Writing.
 David Waltner-Toews (1971) - writer
 Rudy Wiebe - Canadian novelist

Center for Intercultural Teaching and Learning 
On October 25, 2006, Goshen College announced that it was the recipient of a $12.5 million Lilly grant to create the Center for Intercultural Teaching and Learning (CITL). The purpose of this grant was to research challenges that come with changing demographics in rural towns with small colleges. Goshen College is located in Elkhart County which had a large and rapidly growing Latino population at the time (12.6 percent of the population in 2006). Despite growing minority populations, Indiana's minority enrollment in its colleges and universities has only increased two percent.

Traditions 
 Goshen's motto, "Culture for Service," was coined by president Noah E. Byers in 1903.
 Goshen's school colors, purple and white, were modeled after Northwestern University, where President Byers attended and after which he wanted to model Goshen.
 One of the college's many traditions is "sampling" sap from the city of Goshen's official Maple Tree, located on campus, and "testing" how many more weeks of winter there will be. Professors from the science department bring out their equipment with much fanfare to determine the official length of winter. In 2006, the maple tree was removed because of disease rotting the hardwood and was replaced by a new tree, now the official maple tree of Goshen. In 2007, new president Jim Brenneman replaced this tradition (which probably resulted in the early death of the maple) with "Weather or Not Day"; a day celebrating Northern Indiana's fickle weather.
 Early (1925) advertisements for the college were refreshingly direct. One said "Goshen [is] not the best college in the United States. But it is better than the rest for Mennonite young people."

College seal 
Goshen College seal signifies the book that all alumni have signed since graduation, and the lamp signifies the enlightenment that comes with education. As a Christian school, the book also signifies the importance of word, as well as God's call for his people to be "light to the world."

Gallery

References

External links 
 Official website
 Official athletics website

 
Education in Elkhart County, Indiana
Goshen, Indiana
Educational institutions established in 1894
Liberal arts colleges in Indiana
Universities and colleges affiliated with the Mennonite Church
Crossroads League
Buildings and structures in Elkhart County, Indiana
Mennonitism in the United States
Evangelicalism in Indiana
1894 establishments in Indiana
Private universities and colleges in Indiana